Sophie Sumner (born 15 January 1990) is an English fashion model. Their modelling career became notable after they were runner-up of Britain's Next Top Model, Cycle 5 and later won America's Next Top Model, Cycle 18.

Early life
Sumner was born and raised in a caravan in Oxford. They attended school at Cherwell School, The Manor Preparatory, and Headington School, a boarding/day school. Sumner had plans to complete a degree at Teesside University, but decided to defer it after successfully auditioning for Britain's Next Top Model.

Reality TV

Britain's Next Top Model Cycle 5
Sumner was the tenth girl selected for the top thirteen on Britain's Next Top Model, Cycle 5. Over her stay, Sumner received three first call-outs and survived two bottom two appearances over Lisa-Ann Hillman and Annaliese Dayes. She placed as the runner-up in the finale where Mecia Simson won.

Winning America's Next Top Model Cycle 18: British Invasion 
America's Next Top Model, Cycle 18 "British Invasion" premiered on 29 February 2012. It involved seven American model hopefuls against seven British all-stars from Britain's Next Top Model. Sumner was chosen as one of the seven British All-Stars to compete, including both her former fellow Cycle 5 contestants Annaliese Dayes (seventh place) and Ashley Brown (fourth place). The other Britain's Next Top Model girls appearing were second runner-up Jasmia Robinson of Cycle 2, runner-up Louise Watts of Cycle 3, runner-up Catherine Thomas of Cycle 4, and runner-up Alisha White of Cycle 6. 

The judges said of her personality that it "lit up a room", leading to Sumner being labeled "Illuminata" by Tyra Banks herself. Over her stay, Sumner won three challenges and received two first call-outs. In the final judging, the judges selected Sumner over the runner-up Laura LaFrate. Sumner became the fifth winner to have never appeared in the bottom two during her time on Top Model. 

Sumner became the first-ever foreign winner of America's Next Top Model.

After Top Model
Sumner released a single entitled "Aiming For You" on iTunes and her photos for Vogue Italia are featured in the August 2012 issue. She has made billboard advertisements for CoverGirl and for the America's Next Top Model perfume, Dream Come True.  She is active in raising funds for Breast Cancer Research with the help of her pink dog, Darcy.

In 2012, Sumner appeared as Deepika Padukone's friend in the Bollywood film Cocktail, including dancing sequences. Sumner, along with co-stars Allison Harvard and Dominique Reighard, was featured and walked in the 25th anniversary of Bench Universe Denim and Underwear Show in September 2012. In December of the same year, she was a covergirl for MEG Magazine for their frosty December 2012/January 2013 issue. She also attended a fashion show in Montego Bay for Cycle 19 with the contestants.

In 2013, Sumner opened the runway and wore the designs of Singaporean designer Frederick Lee during the finale of Asia's Next Top Model, Cycle 1. In 2015, Sumner starred as "Summer" in the reality TV show Taking New York on E4. In October 2016, Sumner was guest judge in the coronation night of Miss Earth 2016, in the Mall of Asia Arena, Pasay, Metro Manila, Philippines.

References

External links

Living people
English female models
America's Next Top Model winners
Britain & Ireland's Next Top Model contestants
1990 births
People from Oxford
People educated at Headington School
British expatriates in the United States